Predrag Timko (born July 27, 1949) is a handball player who competed for Yugoslavia in the 1976 Summer Olympics. 

In 1976 he was part of the Yugoslav team which finished fifth in the Olympic tournament. He played three matches and scored two goals.

He played for RK Krivaja from Zavidovići and THW Kiel.

External links
 sports-reference.com profile
 THW profile 

1949 births
Living people
Yugoslav male handball players
Olympic handball players of Yugoslavia
Handball players at the 1976 Summer Olympics